Slap in the Face may refer to:

 Slap in the Face (film), a 1970 West German comedy film 
Slap in the Face (album), an album by Henry Ate